Mohurgong & Gulma Tea Estates is a tea garden in the Matigara CD block in the Siliguri subdivision of Darjeeling district  in the state of West Bengal, India.

Geography

Location

Area overview
The map alongside shows the Siliguri subdivision of Darjeeling district. This area is spread across the foothills of the Himalayas and is a plain land gently sloping from north to south. While the northern part is mentioned as the Terai region, the larger southern portion forms the western part of the Dooars region. While 55.11% per cent of the population resides in the rural areas, 44.89% resides in the urban areas. On the western side the Mechi River forms a long border with Nepal. On the eastern side the Mahananda River forms a short border with Bangladesh.

Note: The map alongside presents some of the notable locations in the subdivision. All places marked in the map are linked in the larger full screen map.

Demographics
According to the 2011 Census of India, Mohorgon Tea Garden had a total population of 3,169 of which 1,503 (47%) were males and 1,666 (53%) were females. There were 422 persons in the age range of 0 to 6 years. The total number of literate people in Mohorgon Tea Garden was 1,704 (53.77% of the population over 6 years).

Mohurgong and Gulma Tea Estates
Mohurgong Tea Estate was established by the pioneer Indian planter Bipradas Palchoudhry in 1886. The place is located between Mahananda Wildlife Sanctuary and Siliguri. In 1930 Bipradas's son, Amiya Palchoudhury, purchased the adjoining Gulma Tea Estate from a British company and the two together were developed as a leading tea garden in the terai region. Presently, the fourth generation of the Palchoudhury family operates the tea estate. Large groups of people from the Eastern Himalayan and Chotanagpur regions thronged to work in the tea estate. Their descendants continue to work in the tea garden.

Education
Ila Palchoudhury Memorial High School is a Hndi-medium coeducational institution established in 1981. It has facilities for teaching from class V to class XII.

Transport

There is a station at Gulma, 10 km from New Jalpaiguri Junction railway station, on the New Jalpaiguri-Alipurduar-Samuktala line.

References

Villages in Darjeeling district